Hyde & Seek is an Australian television drama thriller series that premiered on the Nine Network on 3 October 2016 at 8:45 pm. The programme was not renewed for a second season.

Synopsis
When his best mate is killed in a seemingly random attack, Detective Gary Hyde (Matt Nable) vows to bring the killers to justice. Together with his new partner Claire McKenzie (Emma Hamilton), Gary uncovers a criminal underbelly of murder, identity fraud, chaos and intrigue where no one is safe and no one can be trusted.  In a world where crime has no borders and everyone has something to hide, Gary and Claire risk it all to catch the criminals but will they lose their loved ones in the process?

Main cast
 Matt Nable as Gary Hyde, a Detective Sergeant in the New South Wales Police Homicide Squad.
 Emma Hamilton as Claire McKenzie, a special investigator in immigration profiling for the New Zealand Department of Immigration
 Mandy McElhinney as Jackie Walters, Federal Agent and Team Leader of the Australian Federal Police Counter-Terrorism Unit
 Deborra-Lee Furness as Claudia Rossini, Director of Counter-Terrorism for the Australian Secret Intelligence Organisation.
 Zoe Ventoura as Sonya Hyde, wife of Gary Hyde
 Tai Hara as Detective Kevin Soga, a member of the New South Wales Police Homicide Squad
 Claire Lovering as Detective Tanya Martin, a member of the New South Wales Police Homicide Squad
 Jeremy Lindsay Taylor as Andrew Mills, an ASIO Intelligence Officer

Episodes

Viewership

International broadcast
Hyde & Seek debuted on Three in New Zealand on 15 May 2017.

References

External links

Nine Network original programming
Australian drama television series
2016 Australian television series debuts
Television series by Matchbox Pictures